Group B of the 2001 Fed Cup Asia/Oceania Zone Group I was one of two pools in the Asia/Oceania Zone Group I of the 2001 Fed Cup. Five teams competed in a round robin competition, with the top team advancing to the Group I play-off, the winner of which would advance to World Group II Play-offs, and the bottom team being relegated down to 2002 Group II.

Chinese Taipei vs. Thailand

China vs. Kazakhstan

China vs. Thailand

Uzbekistan vs. Kazakhstan

Chinese Taipei vs. Kazakhstan

China vs. Uzbekistan

Chinese Taipei vs. China

Uzbekistan vs. Thailand

Chinese Taipei vs. Uzbekistan

Thailand vs. Kazakhstan

  failed to win any ties in the pool, and thus were relegated to Group II in 2002, where they finished second and thus advanced back to Group I for 2003.

See also
Fed Cup structure

References

External links
 Fed Cup website

2001 Fed Cup Asia/Oceania Zone